Wayne Federman (born June 22, 1959) is an Emmy Award winning American comedian, actor, author, writer, comedy historian, producer, and musician. He is noted for numerous stand-up comedy appearances in clubs, theaters, and on television; his book on The History of Stand-Up; and supporting comedic acting roles in The X-Files, The Larry Sanders Show, Curb Your Enthusiasm, Crashing, Silicon Valley, Legally Blonde, 50 First Dates, The 40-Year-Old Virgin, and Step Brothers. He was the head monologue writer for NBC's Late Night with Jimmy Fallon in its first season. He won a 2022 Primetime Emmy Award for producing the HBO documentary George Carlin's American Dream.

Life and career

Early life: 1959–1976
Federman was born in Los Angeles, one of six children. He grew up in Silver Spring, Maryland, and moved to Plantation, Florida at age 10. He played the drums and at age 14 began performing in a band at local weddings. He taught himself ventriloquism and performed at various school (South Plantation High School) functions as well as local churches and service organizations. He delivered his high school's sports results on Miami radio station WWOK and made his local television debut on WPLG's Youth and the Issue debating the death penalty. In 1976, Federman worked as an extra in John Frankenheimer's Black Sunday, shot at the Miami Orange Bowl.

Federman is Jewish.

New York City: 1977–1986
In the fall of 1977, Federman was accepted into the Tisch School of the Arts at New York University where he studied with legendary acting coach Stella Adler. He performed his own show, Comedy Tonight, at the Eisner and Lubin Auditorium, with future Broadway star Donna Murphy.

After attending NYU, Federman brought his one-man show to the 13th Street Theater. There he performed in rotation with Brother Theodore. He also starred in the theater's long-running production of Snow White and the Seven Dwarfs, in which he played six roles. Soon he was performing stand-up comedy at various New York Comedy Clubs, most notably The Comic Strip (now known as Comic Strip Live) and Catch a Rising Star. It was during these years that he incorporated music into his act. He closed his sets by playing hard rock tunes from Led Zeppelin, Jimi Hendrix, Iron Butterfly, and The Rolling Stones on his electric ukulele.

Federman made his national television debut on the syndicated stand-up program Comedy Tonight in 1986. He also appeared in two home videos: New Wave Comedy and the Dodge Comedy Showcase.

Hollywood: 1987–2008
In 1987, Federman moved to Los Angeles and began working at The Improv, IGBYs, The Laugh Factory, and The Comedy & Magic Club.  He taped a series of televised stand-up performances, including An Evening at the Improv, George Schlatter's Comedy Club, CBS Morning Show, 2 Drink Minimum, Star Search, Good Times Cafe, The A-List, and MTV ½ Hour Comedy Hour. He toured extensively, performing at over 200 colleges.  He co-founded the improvisational group "No Fat Guy" with Marc Raider, Scott LaRose, and Steve Hytner, and later briefly formed a music-comedy team with Jordan Brady.

Federman began booking television commercials and appeared in dozens of national spots for clients, including Eureka Vacuums, Holiday Inn, U.S. Navy, Wendy's, Taboo, Eagle cars (with Greg Kinnear), McDonald's, Glad Bags, Sprite, Total Raisin Bran, Ford, U.S. Olympic Team, Suzuki Samurai, Sizzler, Del Monte, U.S. Cellular, Coors, and 7–11. He gained some prominence as the first "not exactly" guy in the long-running Hertz Rent A Car campaign. Federman began landing small television parts on Baywatch, Amen, Dear John, A Different World, Doogie Howser, and News Radio. He had recurring roles on L.A. Law (3 episodes) and Living Single (3 episodes).

In 1994, Federman made his debut on The Tonight Show and has subsequently appeared many times on the program. He also appeared on Late Fridays, Comedy Showcase, and Premium Blend.  In 2004, he taped his own 1/2-hour stand-up special for the series, Comedy Central Presents.

In 1998, Wayne portrayed Larry Sander's brother Stan on The Larry Sanders Show, and was later reunited with Garry Shandling on The X-Files episode "Hollywood A.D.". Written and directed by David Duchovny, the creative episode followed "Wayne Federman", a Hollywood producer/writer and college friend of assistant FBI director Walter Skinner.

Television led Wayne to film roles in Jack Frost, Dill Scallion, Legally Blonde, 50 First Dates, Charlie's Angels: Full Throttle, The 40-Year-Old Virgin, Unaccompanied Minors, Knocked Up, Step Brothers, Funny People, and The House. He became known for appearing in just one scene in a film and then disappearing; he calls this the "Federman-and-out".

In 2006, Federman landed the recurring role of "Johnson" on the short-lived CBS sitcom Courting Alex. He co-wrote and starred in Max and Josh, a short film that premiered at the 2006 Sundance Film Festival, where it won the Volkswagen Relentless Drive Award.

From 2007 to 2013, Federman wrote, produced, and hosted an annual holiday variety show entitled A Very Federman Christmas at the Los Angeles nightclub Largo. Guests included Paul F. Tompkins, Kevin Nealon, Jon Hamm, Dana Gould, Sarah Silverman, Mary Lynn Rajskub, Samm Levine, Margaret Cho, Greg Behrendt, Willie Garson, Paul Williams, Matt Besser, John C. Reilly, and Andrew Daly.

Voiceover work
In 1990, while shooting a television commercial campaign for McDonald's (directed by Henry Winkler), Federman recorded a series of tie-in radio commercials. This launched his voice-over career. Since then his distinctive voice has been heard on hundreds of radio and television spots. He was the voice of the talking ham and cheese sandwich in the long-running Florida Orange Juice campaign.

He also provided voices for the animated series The Wild Thornberrys,  King of the Hill, and American Dad!, as well as the voice of Cartoon Cartoon Friday on the Cartoon Network.

In 2007, Federman voiced a series of Labatt Beer commercials, portraying a fish, a deer, a boulder, and a slab of ice. This ad was eventually pulled and re-edited when viewers complained of the implied vulgarity.

In 2015, Federman voiced a camel (Phil) in a GEICO insurance commercial.

In 2022, Federman voiced a character for George Carlin's American Dream.

Pete Maravich
In 2000, Federman began co-authoring (with Marshall Terrill) a new, authorized biography of NBA basketball legend Pete Maravich. Working closely with the Maravich family, the book, Maravich, was released on January 3, 2007. It became an Amazon Sports Bestseller.

In 2000, Federman was interviewed for, and served as senior consultant on, the Emmy award-winning CBS Sports documentary, Pistol Pete: The Life and Times of Pete Maravich. He was also featured on both ESPN SportsCentury : Pete Maravich and in ESPN'''s SEC Storied documentary entitled Maravich.

In 2007, Federman edited a highlight montage entitled The Ultimate Pistol Pete Maravich MIX. This mixture of basketball clips from both Maravich's NCAA and NBA careers was posted on YouTube, Yahoo Video, and Google Video. It garnered over one million hits in its first month and was featured in both Sports Illustrated and Dime magazines.

Music and composing
In the 1990s Federman was a founding member of the group Truck Stop Harrys, along with Tudor Sherrard and Matthew Porretta.

Federman co-wrote several songs for the film Dill Scallion and was the music director and keyboardist for Maria Bamford's critically acclaimed The Special Special Special.

Beginning in 2014, Federman became the piano player and music coordinator for Never Not Funny's annual internet telethon, Pardcast-A-Thon.

New York City: 2009–2010
In 2009, Federman moved to New York to help launch NBC's Late Night with Jimmy Fallon. He was the show's head monologue writer in its first season and left in January 2010.

On April 20, 2010, Federman unearthed a long-lost live episode of the General Electric Theater while working on a television retrospective for the Reagan Centennial Celebration. The episode, from December 1954, was noteworthy because it teamed Ronald Reagan with James Dean. Highlights were broadcast on the CBS Evening News, NBC Nightly News, and Good Morning America.

In July 2010, Federman was part of the last comedians to tour and perform for U.S. combat troops throughout Iraq during Operation Iraqi Freedom.

One of Federman's stand-up jokes about Woody Allen ("I’ve come to really admire Woody Allen. It’s been 14 years, and he’s still married to the same daughter.") was voted the No. 4 joke of the year in 2010 by a survey in The New York Post.

Hollywood: 2010–present
In June 2011, Federman headlined the Ukulele Festival of Great Britain along with James Hill.

January 2012 saw the launch of the annual Wayne Federman International Film Festival, featuring comedians screening the movies they love. Participants included Paul F. Tompkins, Garry Shandling, Andy Kindler, Kevin Pollak, Margaret Cho, Doug Benson, Zach Galifianakis, Bill Burr, Will Forte, Sacha Baron Cohen, Chris Hardwick, Lauren Lapkus, Kathy Griffin, Dana Gould, Bill Hader, Patton Oswalt, Tig Notaro, Aziz Ansari, Jeff Garlin, and Sarah Silverman.

In 2014, Federman appeared with singer Kenny Rogers in a national GEICO commercial. In the spot, Rogers sings a portion of his song "The Gambler" during a poker game.

In 2012, 2013, 2014, and 2015, Federman co-wrote the Independent Spirit Awards, hosted by Seth Rogen, Andy Samberg, Patton Oswalt, and the team of Fred Armisen and Kristen Bell respectively. Federman received three Writers Guild of America Award nominations and one Emmy Award nomination for his work.

Federman also wrote on the Creative Arts Emmys (2013, 2014, 2015, 2016, 2019), Critics Choice Awards (2016, 2017, 2020), and The Golden Globes (2017), the DGA Awards (2018, 2019, 2020, 2022), and the SAG Awards (2019).

Podcasting
Federman has guested on over 100 podcasts, including Battleship Pretension, Comedy Bang! Bang!, The Nerdist Podcast, Never Not Funny, Doug Loves Movies, You Made It Weird, The Adam Corolla Show, Ridiculous History, Sup Doc, FitzDog Radio, The Carson Podcast, Improv4Humans, Kevin Pollak Chat Show, Sklarbro Country, The Joe Rogan Experience, Who Charted, and The 500 with Josh Adams Meyers.

From March 2015 until December 2017, Federman co-hosted the podcast Human Conversation with comedian Erin McGathy. The two discussed various, oft-delightful, and meandering topics, without the aid of technology. Human Conversation was suspended when Erin McGathy moved to Ireland.

Federman launched a new podcast in September 2018 entitled, The History of Standup. Along with co-host Andrew Steven, the two chronicle the history of stand-up comedy from Vaudeville to Netflix. In 2019 they completed a second season that focused on "venues, scenes, and events." Some guests that have appeared on The History of Standup include Margaret Cho, Mike Birbiglia, Tig Notaro, Lily Tomlin, Demetri Martin, Shecky Greene, Judd Apatow, Pete Holmes, Jimmy Pardo, journalist Julie Seabaugh, and comedy historian Kliph Nesteroff.

Producing
In 2018, Federman co-produced the Emmy-winning HBO documentary, The Zen Diaries of Garry Shandling. He also produced an award-winning web series with Don Rickles entitled, Dinner With Don, as well as Judd Apatow's 2017 Netflix stand-up special, The Return.

In 2022, Federman produced the two-part HBO documentary George Carlin's American Dream.

Published articles

In November 2011, Federman wrote an article documenting Ronald Reagan's pivotal role during the SAG strike of 1960 that established residual payments for film actors. It was published in The Atlantic.

In January 2013, Federman wrote an article on Pete Maravich's untimely death in 1987. Entitled "A Miracle Heart" the article was published by Slam Magazine.

In September 2015, Federman wrote a long-form article entitled "From Sullivan to CK: a History of Modern American Standup" for Splitsider magazine.

In 2016 Federman penned two articles for Vulture magazine. One, on the enduring impact of comedian Richard Pryor's 1979 concert film - and the other on the many comedy rooms that Federman played over his thirty-plus years performing stand-up comedy.

In 2021 Federman wrote an article for Vulture entitled "The Wild Career of Jackie Mason."

The Chronicles of FedermanThe Chronicles of Federman is a three-volume retrospective of rare audio recordings of Wayne Federman's stand-up career (1984-2015). It was produced by ASpecialThing Records and released in 2016. The liner notes were written by Judd Apatow.

Professorship USC

In the Spring of 2017, Federman began his tenure as an adjunct professor at The University of Southern California. He teaches level-2 stand-up performance and a critical studies course on the history of stand-up comedy for the USC School of Dramatic Arts.

Filmography

Film and television

Other television appearances

 Newsreaders (2014)
 The Neighbors (2013)
 American Dad! (2012)
 The League (2011)
 Running Wilde (2010)
 Late Night with Jimmy Fallon (2009)
 Kathy Griffin: My Life on the D-List (2009)
 Head Case (2008)
 Wizards of Waverly Place (2007)
 Heist (2006)
 Courting Alex (2006)
 Cheap Seats (2006)
 King of the Hill (2005)
 Comedy Central Presents (2004)
 Tough Crowd with Colin Quinn (2003)
 Oliver Beene (2003)
 The Late Late Show with Craig Kilborn  (2002)
 Late Friday  (2001)
 The Sports List (2001)
 D.O.A. (1997) Unaired Christopher Guest HBO Pilot 
 Make Me Laugh  (1997)
 The New Adventures of Robin Hood  (1997)
 Don't Quit Your Day Job (1996)
 Almost Home  (1993)
 Doogie Howser, M.D. (1993)
 Amen (TV series)  (1991)
 WIOU (1990)
 Baywatch  (1990)
 Dear John (1990)
 Parent Trap: Hawaiian Honeymoon  (1989)
 Comedy Tonight (1986)

Discography
 The Chronicles of Federman (2016) AST Records

Documentaries

 Right to Offend: The Black Comedy Revolution (2022) A&E
 We Need to Talk About Cosby (2022) SHOWTIME
 The Story of Late Night (2021) CNN
 The History of Comedy (2018) CNN
 SEC Storied Maravich (2018) ESPN
 I Am Battle Comic (2017)
 Comedy Road (2017)
 Reagan: From Movie Star to President (2017) REELZ 
 Misery Loves Comedy (2016)
 Being Canadian (2015)
 I Am Road Comic (2014)
 Eat, Drink, Laugh: The Story of The Comic Strip (2013)
 I Am Comic (2009)
 Pistol Pete: The Life and Times of Pete Maravich (2001) CBS
 ESPN SportsCentury''  (2001)

Works

References

External links

Official Website
Wayne Federman, Faculty, University of Southern California
Video Clip: A Brief History of Wayne Federman 
Atlantic Article on Ronald Reagan and the 1960 SAG strike
Federman on Pete Maravich NPR Interview
CBS NEWS James Dean Ronald Reagan Rare Film
The History of Stand-Up (podcast)

1959 births
Living people
American biographers
American male biographers
American comedy musicians
American documentary film producers
American male film actors
American memoirists
American podcasters
American stand-up comedians
New York University alumni
Jewish American male comedians
Ventriloquists
American male screenwriters
American male television actors
American male non-fiction writers
American male voice actors
American ukulele players
Male actors from Maryland
Tisch School of the Arts alumni
University of Southern California faculty
People from Plantation, Florida
People from Silver Spring, Maryland
American comedy writers
21st-century American historians
20th-century American male actors
21st-century American male actors
20th-century American comedians
21st-century American comedians
South Plantation High School alumni
20th-century American pianists
21st-century American pianists
Screenwriters from California
American male pianists
Primetime Emmy Award winners